The Phoenix Hotel building at 180 Main Street is the most prominent and distinctive building in downtown Rison, Arkansas.  It is a two-story brick building that was built in 1913 by Dr. T. H. Ackerman to replace a previous hotel building on the site.  The most distinctive feature of its facade is a basket-handled arch that frames the recessed porch on the second floor.  The roof line is more elaborate than that of other downtown buildings, with corbels and brick quoins decorating the roof edge.  The hotel went through a modest number of owners before closing its doors in the 1960s.

The building was listed on the National Register of Historic Places in 2002. The Phoenix Hotel was demolished July 2014. It now is the location of Gateway Bank formerly known as the Bank of Rison.

See also
National Register of Historic Places listings in Cleveland County, Arkansas

References

Hotel buildings on the National Register of Historic Places in Arkansas
Buildings designated early commercial in the National Register of Historic Places
Hotel buildings completed in 1913
Buildings and structures in Cleveland County, Arkansas
1913 establishments in Arkansas
National Register of Historic Places in Cleveland County, Arkansas